Esther Martha Stace (1871/1872–1918) was an Australian equestrian.  She first competed in an event in Walcha in 1891 at the age of 20, where she tied for first place. She continued to compete until within a few years of her death in 1918. She always rode sidesaddle, and wore a scarlet plush outfit in competitions. In 1915 she set a sidesaddle high jump record of 6 feet 6 inches which would stand for 98 years, until 2013.

References 

1870s births
1918 deaths
Australian female equestrians
People from the Mid North Coast
Sportswomen from New South Wales